The following is a complete list of presidents of Baldwin Wallace University. This list includes previous presidents under the school's past names Baldwin–Wallace College, Baldwin University, German Wallace College and Baldwin Institute.

Baldwin Institute

Baldwin University

German Wallace College

Baldwin-Wallace College

Baldwin Wallace University

References

Presidents of Baldwin Wallace University
Baldwin Wallace University presidents
Baldwin Wallace